Veronica was a search engine system for the Gopher protocol, released in November 1992 by Steven Foster and Fred Barrie at the University of Nevada, Reno.

During its existence, Veronica was a constantly updated database of the names of almost every menu item on thousands of Gopher servers. The Veronica database could be searched from most major Gopher menus. Although the original Veronica database is no longer accessible, various local Veronica installations and at least one complete rewrite ("Veronica-2") still exist.

Naming
The search engine was named after the character Veronica Lodge from Archie Comics, an intentional analogy with the naming of the Archie search engine, a search engine for FTP servers.  A backronym for Veronica is "Very Easy Rodent-Oriented Net-wide Index to Computer Archives".

See also
 Archie – a search engine for finding FTP files.
 Jughead – an alternative search engine system for the Gopher protocol.
 WAIS – another client-server text searching system of the same era.

References

External links
 local-veronica source
 Search Veronica-2 an actively indexed re-implementation of Veronica.

Gopher (protocol)
Internet protocols
Internet search engines
Internet Standards
Unix Internet software